Vermillion is a dark science fantasy comic book series set in an eponymous city located in an imagined far future or alternate reality. The series was conceived and written by science fiction author Lucius Shepard as part of the short-lived DC Comics imprint, Helix. The title was cancelled after a one-year publication run shortly before the Helix imprint was itself cancelled by DC and its remaining titles shifted across to the Vertigo line.

Plot
The series narrates the tale of its major protagonist Jonathan Cave, to a man named Brother Fry. It describes the last days of a previous universe whose destruction in turn spawned the never-ending dystopian city-universe of Vermillion:

The series included two notable story arcs during its brief print run: Starlight Drive (issues #1–7) and Lord Iron & Lady Manganese (issues #9 – 11).

References

1996 comics debuts
Dystopian comics
Helix (comics) titles
Science fiction comics